Kyle Murphy may refer to:

Kyle Murphy (cyclist) (born 1991), American cyclist
Kyle Murphy (soccer) (born 1992), American soccer player
Kyle Murphy (American football, born 1993), American football offensive tackle
Kyle Murphy (American football, born 1998), American football offensive tackle